Camille Montgomery (born 20th century in San Francisco) is an American actress in film and television.

Life and career 
Montgomery was born the daughter of a jazz guitarist. She took her first acting lessons at the age of nine and was seen at the Young Performer's Theater at a young age. During high school and college she attended the Community Theater and then studied at the British American Drama Academy with a B.A. in theater arts performance. After studying at Oxford University, she moved to Los Angeles and has been active in film and television ever since.

After a few roles in short films, she played her first female lead in the independent film The Dead and the Damned in 2010, directed by Rene Perez. This was followed by appearances in Giordany Orellana's horror film The Grotto in 2014, in Bennie Woodell's drama Love Meet Hope in 2016 and in David Del Rios horror film Sick for Toys in 2018. In 2020 she was cast in the role of Carole Lombard in the multi-Oscar-nominated film drama Mank, which was produced and directed for Netflix by David Fincher.

In addition to her work in film, she also works as an actress for television. In 2022 she starred in an ensemble cast with Kathleen Robertson, Donald Sutherland, Thomas Dekker, Finn Jones and Diane Kruger in an episode of the drama series Swimming with Sharks.

Selected filmography

Films 
 2010: The Dead and the Damned
 2014: The Grotto
 2015: And the Past Recedes
 2016: Love Meet Hope
 2018: Sick for Toys
 2018: Heaven
 2019: American Dreams
 2020: As Long As I'm Famous
 2020: Mank
 2021: Before I'm Dead

Television 
 2016: Sweet/Vicious (TV-Series, 1 Episode)
 2017: Hey You, It's Me (TV-Series, 1 Episode)
 2022: Swimming with Sharks (TV-Series, 1 Episode)

Short films 
 2014: The Lines in Their Faces
 2015: Blank Pages 
 2016: Möbius
 2019: The Blackbird Interviews
 2020: Pieces of Me
 2021: Unprecedented Times

References

External links
 Website Camille Montgomery
 
 Interview with Camille Montgomery on Vimeo
 Profile Camille Montgomery on Back Stage

Living people
American film actresses
Actresses from San Francisco
21st-century American actresses
American television actresses
People from San Francisco
Year of birth missing (living people)